Puma is an HTTP web server derived from Mongrel and written by Evan Phoenix. It stresses speed and efficient use of memory.

Reception and use 
Puma is the web server shipped with Mastodon and recommended by the Heroku hosting provider as a replacement for Unicorn.

Deliveroo published a benchmark comparing the two servers and concluded “Puma performs better than Unicorn in all tests that were either heavily IO-bound or that interleaved IO and CPU work”, but that Unicorn was still slightly better performing in situations where CPU load was the limiting factor.

References

External links 
 

Free web server software
Free software programmed in Ruby
Web server software for Linux
Software using the BSD license